Stu is a masculine given name or nickname, usually a shortened form (hypocorism) of Stuart or Stewart. It may refer to:

Stuart
 Stu Barnes (born 1970), Canadian retired National Hockey League player
 Stu Block (born 1977), Canadian singer-songwriter
 Stu Briese (born 1945 or 1946), Canadian politician
 Stu Clancy (1906–1965), National Football League quarterback
 Stu Clarke (1906–1985), American Major League Baseball player
 Stu Clarkson (1919–1957), American National Football League player
 Stu Cook (born 1945) American musician, original bassist of Creedence Clearwater Revival
 Stuart Erwin (1903–1967), American actor
 Stu Fisher (fl. 2002–present), English rock drummer
 Stu Gardner, American musician and composer
 Stu Holcomb (1910–1977), American college football and basketball coach and general manager of the Chicago White Sox Major League Baseball team
 Stu Jackson (born 1955), American former National Basketball Association head coach and Executive Vice President
 Stu Kennedy (Canadian football) (1931–2021), Canadian football player
 Stu Laird (born 1960), former Canadian Football League player
 Stu Lang (born 1951), former Canadian Football League player, college head football coach
 Stu Lantz (born 1946), American retired National Basketball Association player, television commentator
 Stu Mackenzie (born 1990), Australian guitarist and singer, frontman of King Gizzard & The Lizard Wizard
 Stu Martin (baseball) (1912–1997), Major League Baseball player
 Stu Miller (1927–2015), American Major League Baseball pitcher
 Stu Pederson (born 1960), Major League Baseball player
 Stu Phillips (composer) (born 1929), American film and television composer and record producer
 Stu Roberts (born 1965), New Zealand former cricketer
 Stu Rosen (1939–2019), American voice actor, television writer, and director
 Stu Smith (1915–1969), American National Football League player
 Stu Sutcliffe (1940–1962), British painter and musician, original bassist for The Beatles
 Stu Whittingham (born 1994), Scottish cricketer
 F. Stuart Wilkins (1928–2011),  American football player, lawyer and businessman

Stewart
 Stu Hart (1915–2003), Canadian amateur and professional wrestler, promoter and trainer
 Stu Linder (1931–2006), American film editor

Other or indeterminate
 Steve Burguiere (born 1976), American radio producer
 Stu Davis (David Stewart; 1921–2007), Canadian singer
 Stu Jacobs (born 1965), New Zealand former footballer
 Stu Martin (drummer) (1938–1980), American jazz drummer
 Stu Nahan (1926–2007), Canadian-American sportscaster
 Stu Phillips (country singer) (born 1933), Canadian
 Stu Rasmussen (born 1948), American politician
 Stu Williamson (1933–1991), American jazz trumpeter

Fictional characters
 Stu, a character in the movie 2009 American comedy film The Hangover
 Stu Macher, a character in the 1996 American satirical slasher Scream
 Disco Stu, a recurring character in The Simpsons
 Stu Bergman, on the soap opera Search for Tomorrow
 Stu Redman, in Stephen King's The Stand
 Stu Pickles, in Rugrats
 Stu, in the 2006 animated film Ice Age: The Meltdown
 Stu, a fictional character in the American animated series Wow! Wow! Wubbzy!
 Stu, a bull villager from the video game series Animal Crossing

See also
 stu, an ISO 639-3 code for the Blang language of Myanmar and China
 Stew (disambiguation), including a list of people named Stew

Masculine given names
Lists of people by nickname
Hypocorisms